Vejprnice is a municipality and village in Plzeň-North District in the Plzeň Region of the Czech Republic. It has about 4,400 inhabitants.

Geography
It lies in the Plasy Uplands, in a relatively flat landscape. The Vejprnický Stream flows through the municipality.

History
The first written mention of Vejprnice is in the foundation deed of the Břevnov Monastery from 993. A fortress in Vejprnice was first documented in 1318. Thanks to its proximity to Plzeň, the municipality experienced rapid development in recent decades.

Demographics

Sights
The landmark of Vejprnice is the Church of Saint Adalbert. The current church was built in 1722–1723 and was designed by architect František Maxmilián Kaňka or his disciple František Ignác Preé.

Notable people
Jakub Husník (1837–1916), painter, art teacher and inventor

References

External links

Villages in Plzeň-North District